Viktor Lutze (28 December 1890 – 2 May 1943) was a German Nazi Party functionary and the commander of the Sturmabteilung  ("SA") who succeeded Ernst Röhm as Stabschef and Reichsleiter. After he died from injuries received in a car accident, Lutze was given an elaborate state funeral in Berlin on 7 May 1943.

Early life
Lutze was born in Bevergern, Westphalia, in 1890. He was employed by the Reichspost from 1907 until he joined the Prussian Army in 1912. He served with the 55th Infantry Regiment and then fought in the 369th Infantry Regiment and 15th Reserve Infantry Regiment during the First World War. He served as a platoon leader and a company commander and lost an eye in combat. After his discharge in 1919 with the rank of Oberleutnant, Lutze returned to his postal job and then became a salesman and a business manager. He also joined the Deutschvölkischer Schutz- und Trutzbund, the largest, most active and most influential anti-Semitic organisation in the Weimar Republic.

Nazi Party and SA
Lutze joined the National Socialist German Workers Party (NSDAP; Nazi Party) in 1922, and the SA in 1923. He became an associate of Franz Pfeffer von Salomon, the first leader of the SA. Together, they determined the structure of the organisation.

He also worked with Albert Leo Schlageter in the resistance and the sabotage of the Belgian and French occupation of the Ruhr in 1923. He became the deputy Gauleiter for the Ruhr in 1926. His organization of the Ruhr for the SA became a model for other regions. In 1930, he was elected to the Reichstag as a representative for Hannover-Braunschweig. In October 1931, he organized a huge joint rally in Braunschweig (Brunswick) of SA and SS men to show strength in strife-weary Germany and loyalty to their leader, Adolf Hitler. That was before Hitler came to national power as Chancellor of Germany in January 1933. Over 100,000 men attended the rally, hosted by SA-Gruppe Nord under the leadership of Lutze. At the rally, the SA assured Hitler of their loyalty, and he in turn increased the size of the SA with the creation of 24 new Standarten (regiment-sized formations). Hitler never forgot that show of loyalty by Lutze. A badge was made to commemorate the event. Lutze rose through the ranks and by 1933 was a SA-Obergruppenführer. On 15 February 1933, he was appointed police president of the Prussian Province of Hanover, and on 25 March 1933, he became the Oberpräsident of the provincial government and served until 28 March 1941.

Purge of Röhm
Lutze played an important part in the Night of the Long Knives (June–July 1934). He informed Hitler about Ernst Röhm's anti-régime activities. In preparation for the purge, both Heinrich Himmler and his deputy, Reinhard Heydrich, chief of the SS Security Service (SD), assembled dossiers of manufactured evidence to suggest that Röhm had planned to overthrow Hitler. Meanwhile, Göring, Himmler, Heydrich and Lutze, at Hitler's direction, drew up lists of those who should be liquidated that started with seven top SA officials and including many more. The names of 85 victims are known, but estimates place the total number killed at up to 200 people. 

After the purge, Lutze succeeded Röhm as Stabschef SA, but the SA no longer had as prominent a role as it had in the early days of the party. Lutze's major tasks included overseeing a large reduction in the SA, a task that was welcomed by the SS and by the regular armed forces. On 30 June 1934, Hitler issued a twelve-point directive to Lutze to clean up and to reorganise the SA. On 20 July 1934, Lutze also was appointed to Röhm's position as a Reichsleiter, the second-highest political rank in the Nazi Party. On 26 June 1935, he was made a member of the Hans Frank's Academy for German Law. He retained those positions until his death.

At the Nazi Party Congress in Nuremberg in September 1934, William L. Shirer observed Hitler speaking to the SA for the first time since the purge (Hitler had absolved the SA from the crimes committed by Röhm). Shirer also noted Lutze speaking there (Lutze reaffirmed the SA's loyalty). Shirer described Lutze as possessing a shrill unpleasant voice, and thought that the "SA boys received him coolly". Leni Riefenstahl's film Triumph of the Will, however, shows the SA mobbing Lutze as he departs at the end of his evening-rally speech. His automobile can barely make it through the crowd. Alone among the speakers (apart from Hitler), Lutze receives the dramatic low-angle shots while he stands solo at the podium. Riefenstahl's footage shows only Hitler, Himmler and Lutze in the march to the World War I cenotaph, where they lay a wreath. The makers of the film give the then little-known Lutze some of the prestige of a party leader to draw attention away from the former SA leader, Ernst Röhm, who had appeared often by the side of Hitler in the previous Riefenstahl film of the 1933 Party Congress, Der Sieg des Glaubens. After the Night of the Long Knives and Röhm's murder, the film was withdrawn from circulation, and all prints were ordered destroyed, probably by Hitler; the film is known today only from a copy found in the Film Archive of the German Democratic Republic in the 1980s.)

Foreign organisation
After the Anschluss, Lutze traveled to Austria to help reorganise the SA there.

In September 1938, SA Stabschef Lutze travelled to Passau to welcome Nazis who had returned from the Reichsparteitag in Nuremberg. Lutze stayed at "Veste Oberhaus" and seized the opportunity to meet Johann Nepomuk Kühberger, who had once helped to save Hitler from drowning in the Inn River. Now, he was a priest and played the organ at Passau Cathedral.

The reintroduction of military conscription in 1935 reduced the size of the SA significantly. Its most visible role after the purge was in assisting the SS in perpetrating the Kristallnacht in November 1938. In February 1939, Lutze reviewed a parade of 20,000 Blackshirts in Rome and then set off for a tour of Italy's Libyan border with Tunisia.

Death and funeral

In January 1939, the role of the SA was officially mandated as a training school for the armed forces with the establishment of the SA Wehrmannschaften (SA Military Units). Then, in September 1939, with the start of World War II in Europe, the SA lost most of its remaining members to military service in the Wehrmacht (armed forces). Lutze maintained his position in the weakened SA until his death.

On 1 May 1943 he was driving a car near Potsdam with his entire family. Driving too fast on a curve caused an accident that badly injured Lutze, killed his older daughter Inge and badly injured his younger daughter. 

Lutze died during an operation in a hospital in Potsdam the next evening. News reports stated that the accident involved another vehicle and kept the news of reckless driving from the public. Hitler ordered Joseph Goebbels to convey his condolences to Viktor's wife, Paula, and son, Viktor. Goebbels, in his diaries, had described Lutze as a man of "unlimited stupidity" but upon his death decided that he was a decent fellow. At the time of the accident, Lutze was 52 years old.

Hitler ordered a lavish state funeral on 7 May 1943 to take place in the Reich Chancellery. Hitler attended in person, which he rarely did at that stage in the war, and posthumously awarded Lutze the highest award of the Nazi Party, the German Order, 1st Class. Thereafter, Hitler appointed Wilhelm Schepmann to succeed Lutze as Stabschef SA, but the organisation had by then been thoroughly marginalised.

Decorations and awards
1914 Iron Cross 2nd Class
1914 Iron Cross 1st Class
1918 Wound Badge in Silver
Commander's Cross of the Order of Military Merit (Bulgaria) with War Decoration, 16.7.1918
1929 Nuremberg Party Day Badge, 1929
The Honour Cross of the World War 1914/1918 with Swords, 1934
Anschluss Medal, 1938
Sudetenland Medal, 1939

See also
 Glossary of Nazi Germany
 List of Nazi Party leaders and officials

References

Citations

Bibliography
 
 
 
 
 
 

 
 Rosmus, Anna (2015). Hitlers Nibelungen, Samples Grafenau.

Further reading
 Campbell, Bruce B. "The SA after the Röhm Purge", Journal of Contemporary History, 1993.
 Hinton, David B. "Triumph of the Will: Document or Artifice?", Cinema Journal, Autumn 1975, pp. 49–50.
 ”Lutze, Nazi Leader, "Dies of His Injuries", New York Times, May 4, 1943, p. 3.
 "Nazi Storm Troop Chief Badly Hurt in Accident", New York Times, May 3, 1943, p. 8 (It conveys the early story that Lutze's car collided with another).
 Read, Anthony. The Devil's Disciples: Hitler's Inner Circle. W. W. Norton, 2005.
 Shirer, William L. Berlin Diary, New York: Popular Library, 1940.

External links
 

1890 births
1943 deaths
German police chiefs
Members of the Academy for German Law
Members of the Reichstag of the Weimar Republic
Members of the Reichstag of Nazi Germany
Nazi Party officials
Nazi Party politicians
People from the Province of Westphalia
Recipients of the Iron Cross (1914), 1st class
Recipients of the German Order (decoration)
Reichsleiters
Road incident deaths in Germany
Sturmabteilung officers
20th-century Freikorps personnel
German Army personnel of World War I